Chandler Island is an island  long which is the southernmost of the ice-covered White Islands, located at the head of Sulzberger Bay. It was mapped by the  United States Geological Survey from surveys and from U.S. Navy air photos, 1959–65, and named by the Advisory Committee on Antarctic Names for Dr. Alan Chandler, electrical engineer with the Byrd Station winter party in 1969.

See also 
 List of antarctic and sub-antarctic islands

References 

Islands of the Ross Dependency
King Edward VII Land